Leonard Lewisohn (1953 – 6 August 2018) was an American author, translator and lecturer in the area of Islamic studies and a specialist in Persian language and Sufi literature. He was the editor of Mawlana Rumi Review, a publication of the Rumi Institute and Archetype, Cambridge, published once a year. He was a member of the Institute of Arab and Islamic Studies in University of Exeter.

Works
 with L Anvar, Wondrous Words: The Poetic Mastery of Jalal al-Din Rumi, Nicosia, London, Rumi Institute and I.B. Tauris, 2011.
 Lewisohn L (eds) The Philosophy of Ecstasy: Rumi and the Sufi Tradition, Nicosia, London, Rumi Institute and I.B. Tauris, 2011.
 Lewisohn L (eds) Hafez and the Religion of Love in Classical Sufi Poetry, London, I.B. Tauris, 2010.
 with R Bly, Angels Knocking at the Tavern Door: Thirty Poems of Hafiz, New York, Harper Collins, 2008.
 with C Shackle, Attar and the Persian Sufi Tradition: The Art of Spiritual Flight, I B Tauris, 2007.
 The Wisdom of Sufism, Oxford, Oneworld, 2001.
 The Heritage of Sufism, vol. 2: The Legacy of Mediæval Persian Sufism, Oxford, Oneworld, 1999.
 Lewisohn L,Morgan D (eds) The Heritage of Sufism, vol. 3: Late Classical Persianate Sufism: the Safavid and Mughal Period, Oxford, 1999
 The Heritage of Sufism, vol. 1: Classical Persian Sufism from its Origins to Rumi, Oxford, Oneworld, 1999.
 Beyond Faith and Infidelity: the Sufi Poetry and Teachings of Mahmud Shabistari, Richmond, Surrey, Curzon Press, 1995.
 Divan-i Muhammad Shirin Maghribi, Tehran University Press and the McGill Institute of Islamic Studies, Tehran Branch; Wisdom of Persia Series No. XLIII, in collaboration with London University: SOAS Publications, 1993.
 An Anthology of Esoteric Traditions in Islam: Texts on Gnosis & Hermeneutics in Ismailism, Sufism, Muslim Philosophy, Twelver Shi‘ism & Illuminationism, London, I.B. Tauris and the Institute of Ismaili Studies

Sources

External links
 Lewisohn's biography
 Lewisohn at University of Exeter

American Islamic studies scholars
American orientalists
1953 births
2018 deaths
Academics of the University of Exeter
Rumi scholars
Researchers of Persian literature